The Shell Game, is a 1918 American silent drama film, directed by George D. Baker. It stars Emmy Wehlen, Henry Kolker, and Joseph Kilgour, and was released on March 4, 1918.

Cast

References

External links 
 
 
 

1918 drama films
1918 films
Silent American drama films
American silent feature films
American black-and-white films
Metro Pictures films
Films directed by George D. Baker
1910s English-language films
1910s American films